The Basilica of Saint Nicolas is a basilica in the town of Saint-Nicolas-de-Port in Grand Est, France. It is a pilgrimage site, supposedly holding relics of Saint Nicholas brought from Italy.

Background
Nicolas became the patron saint of the Duchy of Lorraine. The current basilica was built in the 15th and 16th centuries and has fine Renaissance painted glass windows by Nicolas Droguet of Lyon, Valentin Bousch of Strasbourg, Hans von Kulmbach and Veit Hirsvogel from Nuremberg, Georges Millereau and other unknown artists, as well as 19th century replacements for lost glass works. It is a French Monument historique since 1840, and a minor basilica since 1950.

References

Basilica churches in France
Minor basilicas
Churches in Meurthe-et-Moselle
Gothic architecture in France
Monuments historiques of Grand Est
Saint Nicholas